Mehdi Mohammadi (born 28 April 1981) is an Iranian footballer.

Club career
Mohammadi joined Steel Azin F.C. in 2009 after spending the previous season with Moghavemat Sepasi F.C.

Club career statistics

 Assist Goals

References

1981 births
Living people
Persian Gulf Pro League players
Azadegan League players
Paykan F.C. players
Fajr Sepasi players
Iranian footballers
Steel Azin F.C. players
Sanat Mes Kerman F.C. players
Saba players
Association football central defenders